Folk dances of Jharkhand represent  its vibrant culture and tradition. There are various folk dance in the state of Jharkhand which are performed during harvest season, festival and social gatherings. Some folk and tribal dances in Jharkhand are Jhumair, Mardana Jhumair, Janani Jhumair, Domkach, Lahasua, Jhumta, Fagua, Paika, Chhau, Firkal, Mundari and Santali.

List of Folk dances
Some folk dances are as follows:

Jhumair

Jhumair is popular folk dance of Jharkhand. It performed during harvest season and festivals. Musical Instruments used are Mandar, Dhol, Nagara, Dhak, Bansi Shehnai.

Mardani Jhumair

Mardani Jhumar is Nagpuri folk dance performed by men. Men wear ghungroo, hold sword and dance in the circle.

Janani Jhumair

Janani Jhumair is Nagpuri folk dance performed by women.The dance have feminine grace.

Domkach

Domkach is a folk dance performed in Jharkhand in marriage.

Fagua 
Fagua is a  folk dance performed by both men and women during festival of Fagua. The musical instruments used are Mandar, Dhol and Bansi.

Paiki

Paiki is a Nagpuri ceremonial martial dance. It is performed by men. Men wear ghungroo, dance holding sword and shield. Music instruments used are Nagara, Dhak, and Shehnai.

Chhau dance

Chhau dance is a semi-classical Indian dance with tribal and folk tradition, found in  district of Jharkhand.

Firkal dance

Firkal is a martial art folk-dance of Bhumij tribes. The main instruments of Firkal are swords, arrows, bows and shields. It can be found in Potka block in East Singhbhum district of Jharkhand.

Mundari dance
Munda tribe have its own dance which performed during harvest season and festival accompanied by musical Instrument Madal, Nagara and Bansi. Munda refer to their dance and song as durang and Susun respectively Mundari folk dance are Jadur and Jena.

Santali dance 
Santal tribe have its own unique dance. They performed it during harvest season and festival accompanied by instruments such as Madal and Nagara.

Kurukh dance
Kurukh tribe
perform folk dances during different occasions such as harvesting, festival, marriage etc. In kurukh language dance is called "Dandi". Some folk dance of Kurukh tribe are Jagra Matha, Jadur, Karam dandi,  khaddi and dudhiya etc.

Ranga is also folk dance of Jharkhand.

References

 
Culture of Jharkhand